Front Row Wrestling is an American independent professional wrestling promotion located in Rochester, New Hampshire. It is one of the few New England-based promotions outside Massachusetts, such as Pro Wrestling America Live in Maine and Joel Gertner's MXW Pro Wrestling in Connecticut, and is the only wrestling promotion active in the state of New Hampshire. Founded by wrestler Scott C. Despres in 2003, it is the sister promotion of Eastern Wrestling Alliance and an affiliate of the National Wrestling Alliance. FRW has co-promoted events and hosted sanctioned title defenses of both promotions.

A number of Northeastern independent stars competed for FRW, including Brian Milonas, Chase Del Monte, Tommaso Ciampa, Johnny Handsome, "The Alpha Male" Justin Powers and Antonio "The Promise" Thomas. The promotion also has a small women's division, largely dominated by Sarah Blackheart, Mistress Belmont and Vanity Vixxxen, but also brought in Sara Del Rey, Mercedes Martinez, Ariel, Alere Little Feather and Awesome Kong. Matt Calamare, the only working deaf professional wrestling referee, also regularly appeared for the promotion.

On February 26, 2010, Despres announced the promotion would be forming a partnership with NWA Liberty States, formerly No Limit Pro, to promote wrestling events throughout New England under the banner of the National Wrestling Alliance.

History
Front Row Wrestling was started by Scott C. Despres, better known as New England independent wrestler Maverick Wild, in 2003 and held its first show in Milford, New Hampshire, that year. When Steve Bradley's Wrestling Federation of America closed its doors a year later, the promotion became the sole wrestling promotion in the state of New Hampshire. Although the promotion struggled financially during its first years, partly due to Despres' inexperience as a promoter, it eventually gained a small but loyal following in the Rochester area. The promotion not only established a home arena at the Rochester American Legion Hall but began touring cities throughout New Hampshire within two years. In the summer of 2006, they visited Claremont where it performed at a children's community center in Claremont Park. That same year, they co-promoted an event in Gardner, Massachusetts, with the Eastern Wrestling Alliance. It was one of FRW's first successful shows, with a record 175 fans in attendance.

It eventually took over the WFA's former home base in Dover, New Hampshire, as well. This change influenced one of the promotion's earliest storylines, which pitted one-time WFA stars, known as the Dover Legends, against "heel" manager The Grand Wizard of Wrestling and his Stable of Assassins. Among its earliest stars were former WFA mainstays such as "The Alpha Male" Justin Powers and Antonio "The Promise" Thomas as well as Northeastern independent stars including Maverick Wild, Chase Del Monte, Tommaso Ciampa, Brian Milonas, and Johnny Handsome. Handsome spent part of his early career in the promotion. FRW also developed a small women's division, largely dominated by Sarah Blackheart, Mistress Belmont and Vanity Vixxxen, and would come to include Sara Del Rey, Mercedes Martinez, Ariel, Alere Little Feather and Awesome Kong. Matt Calamare, the only working deaf referee in professional wrestling, also frequently appeared for the promotion.

In early 2007, the promotion was involved in a minor controversy with Rochester city officials when they suddenly shut down Rochester American Legion Hall a little over eight hours before the start of FRW's January 12 supercard "Friday the 12th". According to Despres, an estimated 90-150 fans were turned away. FRW was forced to offer a full refund for all the tickets purchased and was prohibited from running shows in the city until he was issued a special permit by the city council. He met with the council in May and again in November 2007 in order to promote shows in the town. Meanwhile, FRW continued to tour New Hampshire, returning to Claremont in the spring and looking into securing an alternate venue outside of Rochester. Eventually, Despres and the city came to a settlement allowing FRW the use of the Rochester American Legion Hall.

On June 23, 2007, FRW held its first card outside the New Hampshire area at the Memorial Ice Arena in Winchendon, Massachusetts. The main event featured a first-ever "champion vs. champion" match between FRW All Star Champion Kid Krazy and Granite State Champion Christian Angers. On February 8, 2008, Despres was a guest on the internet radio show Rumble Radio Online. On June 11, FRW was one of several New England independent promotions which participated in a special benefit show for Brandon Cusick, a 5-year-old child diagnosed with leukemia, at the Bank Street Armory in Fall River, Massachusetts. Seven months later in Rochester, on November 15, 2008, the FRW Tag Team Championship changed hands in a 6-person intergender match between The Pleasures of Pain & Mistress Belmont and Tony Star, Sethoran and Vanity Vixxxen. Also on the card, Shane Sharpe defeated Justin Shaype in a 2 out of 3 falls match to win the heavyweight championship.

On July 31, 2009, on the first night of his tour of the East Coast of the United States, Antonio Thomas defeated Shane Sharpe in an Iron Man match in Rochester. In addition to running shows in New Hampshire and Massachusetts, FRW made its Vermont debut in White River Junction on September 25. Tony Spencer, then FRW Granite State Champion, appeared on the October 10th edition of the internet call-in radio show Late Nite JengaJam. Among the topics he discussed included his thoughts on the death of Lou Albano, the state of the wrestling industry and World Wrestling Entertainment, and his own career in Front Row Wrestling. On November 6, 2009, Maverick Wild was forced to leave FRW after losing to Bruiser Costa at the American Legion in Rochester. Also on the card, Christian Angers & Stephen Marriott won the FRW Tag Team Championship from Shawn Sharp and Cameron Blaze, and Johnny Vegas defeated Sethoran to become the new FRW All Star Champion.

On February 26, 2010, Despres announced the promotion would be forming a partnership with NWA Liberty States, formerly No Limits Pro, to promote wrestling events throughout New England under the banner of the National Wrestling Alliance. Despres continued co-promoting NWA Liberty States with Joey Eastman for another year. The promotion was then taken over by Todd Sople, which left the NWA around this time, and relocated to Dracut, Massachusetts as Liberty States Pro Wrestling. In an October 2017 interview, Despres confirmed he would not bring back Front Row Wrestling due to his retirement and believed running an independent promotion in New England was no longer profitable.

Alumni

 

Male wrestlers

Female wrestlers

Stables and tag teams

Managers and valets

Championships

FRW All Star Championship

The FRW All Star Championship was the main professional wrestling championship defended in Front Row Wrestling. It was the original heavyweight title of the All-Star Wrestling Association from 2002 to 2005, and continued to be defended in FRW until the promotion merged with NWA Liberty States, the National Wrestling Alliance affiliate in Massachusetts, in February 2010.

Title history

FRW Granite State Championship

The FRW Granite State Championship was a secondary professional wrestling championship defended in Front Row Wrestling. As its name suggests, the title was contested in matches specifically in the state of New Hampshire and existed from 2005 until FRW's merger with NWA Liberty States, the National Wrestling Alliance affiliate in Massachusetts, in 2010.

Title history

FRW Tag Team Championship

The FRW Tag Team Championship was the major tag team title in Front Row Wrestling from 2005 until 2010. As former holders of the All-Star Wrestling Association Tag Team Championship, albeit with separate partners, Dr. Reginald Heresy and Christian Angers were introduced as the inaugural tag team champions in late 2005. The title existed until FRW's merger with NWA Liberty States, the National Wrestling Alliance affiliate in Massachusetts, in 2010.

Title history

FRW Ladies All Star Championship

The FRW Ladies All Star Championship was a short-lived women's professional wrestling title in Front Row Wrestling, which was defended for less than a year before the promotion merged with NWA Liberty States, the National Wrestling Alliance affiliate in Massachusetts, in February 2010.

Title history

Notes

References

External links
FrontRowWrestling.net
Front Row Wrestling, original website
Photographs: Front Row Wrestling

Entertainment companies established in 2003
Companies based in New Hampshire
Independent professional wrestling promotions based in New England
Independent professional wrestling promotions based in New Hampshire